WCNY-FM (Classic FM) is a public radio station in Syracuse, New York that plays classical music and is a National Public Radio (NPR) member station. Broadcasting on 91.3 MHz, the station is owned and operated by The Public Broadcasting Council of Central New York, Inc. and shares studios with WCNY-TV on West Fayette Street in Syracuse's Near Westside neighborhood. The station broadcasts oldies from the 1950s and 1960s on its second HD Radio subchannel and jazz on a third channel.

Stations
The programming is broadcast on three stations:

References

External links
 WCNY-FM official site
 
 
 

HD Radio stations
CNY-FM
NPR member stations
Radio stations established in 1971
1971 establishments in New York (state)
Classical music radio stations in the United States